The following are the national public holidays and other observances of Argentina.

Though holidays of many faiths are respected, public holidays usually include most Catholic based holidays. Historic holidays include the celebration of the May Revolution (25 May), Independence Day (9 July), National Flag Day (20 June) and the death of José de San Martín (17 August).

The extended family gathers on Christmas Eve at around 9 p.m. for dinner, music, and often dancing. Candies are served just before midnight, when the fireworks begin. They also open gifts from Papá Noel (Father Christmas or "Santa Claus"). New Year's Day is also marked with fireworks. Other widely observed holidays include Good Friday, Easter, Labor Day (1 May) and Veterans Day (formerly Malvinas Day, 2 April).

Public holidays in 2022 

The "movable holidays" whose dates coincide with Tuesdays and Wednesdays will be moved to the previous Monday. Those that coincide with Thursday, Friday, Saturday and Sunday will be moved to the following Monday. Every employee is entitled to 15 paid public holidays and every year the government adds a few more holidays known as "bridge holidays" which means that a holiday last two days.

Non-working days 

The following are federal non-working national or religious holidays, during which people of the following faiths are excused from work:

Bicentennial holidays 

As part of the celebration of the Independence Day Bicentennial, the following extraordinary and one-time holidays were arranged:

 February 27, 2012: Bicentenary of the creation of the Flag of Argentina and the first pledge to it.
 September 24, 2012: Bicentenary of the Battle of Tucumán.
 January 31, 2013: Bicentenary of the inaugural session of the Assembly of the Year XIII.
 February 20, 2013: Bicentenary of the Battle of Salta.
 July 9, 2016: Bicentennial of the Argentine Declaration of Independence.

Other observances
 Argentine National Anthem Day (Día del Himno Nacional Argentino) on May 11. Not a holiday.
 May Week (Semana de Mayo) on May 18-24. Not a holiday
 Father's Day (Día del Padre) on the third Sunday of June. Not a holiday.
 Friend's Day (Día del Amigo) on July 20. Not a holiday.
 Children's Day (Día de la Niñez) on the third Sunday of August. Not a holiday.
 Teacher's Day (Día del Maestro) on September 11. Anniversary of the death of Domingo Faustino Sarmiento in 1888. Holiday only for primary and high school students.
 Student's Day (Día del Estudiante) on September 21. Holiday only for high school and university students.
 Mother's Day (Día de la Madre) on the third Sunday of October. Not a holiday.
 Tradition Day (Día de la Tradición) on November 10. Anniversary of the birth of José Hernández in 1834. Not a holiday.

External links
Official Public holidays in Argentina Ministerio del Interior.
Argentina Public Holidays Argentina Public Holidays

Sources 

 
Argentina
Holidays
Holidays